Naidangiin Otgonjargal (born November 14, 1979, in Bulgan sum, Arkhangai aimag) is an amateur Mongolian freestyle wrestler, who played for the women's lightweight category. Between 2001 and 2004, Otgonjargal had won a total of three medals (one gold and two bronze) for the 51 and 55 kg classes at the Asian Wrestling Championships. She also captured two bronze medals in the same division at the 2002 Asian Games in Busan, South Korea, and at the 2006 Asian Games in Doha, Qatar.

Otgonjargal represented Mongolia at the 2008 Summer Olympics in Beijing, where she competed for the women's 55 kg class. She lost the first preliminary round match to Canadian wrestler and Olympic silver medalist Tonya Verbeek, who was able to score seven points in two straight periods, leaving Otgonjargal without a single point.

References

External links
 
Profile – International Wrestling Database
NBC 2008 Olympics profile

Mongolian female sport wrestlers
1979 births
Living people
Olympic wrestlers of Mongolia
Wrestlers at the 2008 Summer Olympics
Wrestlers at the 2002 Asian Games
Wrestlers at the 2006 Asian Games
Asian Games medalists in wrestling
Asian Games bronze medalists for Mongolia
Medalists at the 2002 Asian Games
Medalists at the 2006 Asian Games
Asian Wrestling Championships medalists
20th-century Mongolian women
21st-century Mongolian women